Natalia Stamuli (born January 13, 1996) is an Albanian fashion model, show girl and beauty pageant title holder, crowned Miss Earth Albania in 2013.

References

Albanian beauty pageant winners
Living people
People from Tirana
1996 births